Ropers Bunion is a summit in the U.S. state of Oregon.

Ropers Bunion was named after Fordyce Roper, a local industrialist.

References

Mountains of Jackson County, Oregon
Mountains of Oregon